University College (UniCol), founded in 1969, is the largest residential hall at the University of Otago in Dunedin, New Zealand.  It houses approximately 501 residents during the academic year. Originally consisting of two towers, North Tower and South Tower, it has since been expanded with the acquisition of a set of flats on Clyde street and then in 2004 with the Northern and Southern Annexes. It is the most central college on the campus, situated beside the university's original buildings. The college is home to a variety of University of Otago students from all over the world. These students pursue a myriad of different degrees. 

Te Whare Raiona (House of the Lion), so named to incorporate the ornate brass lions that feature prominently at the front of the building. It has since been incorporated into the College's official logo, merchandise and flags.

History
Historically, University College's South Tower housed males while the North Tower housed females. However, both towers today are unisex, with students sharing all facilities including bathrooms and showers. Highlights throughout the year include orientation week, formal dinners, ski trips, the ball, floor missions.

In early October 2019, a fire in the South Tower and the resulting water damage from the sprinkler system led to the evacuation of 60 Otago University students, who had to sleep with friends or at the University library. Due to water damage, the second, first, ground, and lower-ground floors had been evacuated.

Wardens
 D. F. Symon, 1969–1985
 P. I. C. Rennie, 1986–1992
 C. P. M. Geary, 1993–1996
 Ashley Day, 1997–2007
 Chris Addington, 2007 – 2018
 Andy Walne, 2019 – 2021
 Pauline Donovan, 2022 - Present

Notable Past Residents

A seminar room is dedicated to former resident Mark Parker, who died in the 2002 Bali bombings.

References

External links
 University College website
 University College Official Facebook Page

Buildings and structures of the University of Otago
University residences in New Zealand
1960s architecture in New Zealand
Brutalist architecture in New Zealand